Joe Hammond (also known as "The Destroyer") was an American streetball basketball player based in Harlem New York. He attended Taft High School in the Bronx, but he dropped out of school in the 9th grade and thus never played college basketball. He did play in the Eastern Basketball Association with the Allentown Jets.

Career 
A streetball player, Hammond once scored 50 points in a half against Julius Erving at Rucker Park. In the 1971 NBA hardship draft, he was selected with the fifth pick of the 1971 Early Entry draft by the Los Angeles Lakers. He also turned down a three-year contract to play in the American Basketball Association.

He was arrested for dealing drugs and was sentenced to 11 years in prison. In 1990, he was described as being the best streetball player ever by The New York Times. He later sued Nike and Foot Locker for $5 million for using his image without his permission.

References

Year of birth missing (living people)
Living people
Allentown Jets players
American men's basketball players
Los Angeles Lakers draft picks
Point guards
Street basketball players
People from Harlem
Sportspeople from Manhattan
Basketball players from New York City